Zilly is a surname. Notable people with the surname include:

Franz Zilly, German figure skater
Jack Zilly (1921–2009), American football player
Thomas Samuel Zilly (born 1935), American judge

See also
Lilly (surname)
Zilli (disambiguation)